Nikos Katsavakis (born 16 May 1979) is a retired Greek and Cypriot footballer. He last played as a defender for Panserraikos and aspires to become a professional football trainer, like his father Makis Katsavakis.
Nikos Katsavakis has one cap with the Cyprus national football team.

Career
Born in Serres, Katsavakis began playing football with local side Serres 85. He joined Greek Superleague side Veria F.C. in July 1996. He joined Kavala F.C. the next season, and would appear in 14 Greek Superleague matches for the club.

References

External links
 

1979 births
Living people
Footballers from Serres
Greek footballers
Cypriot footballers
Veria F.C. players
Kavala F.C. players
Panserraikos F.C. players
Anorthosis Famagusta F.C. players
Apollon Limassol FC players
Super League Greece players
Cypriot First Division players
Expatriate footballers in Cyprus
Cyprus international footballers
Association football central defenders